Juan Sánchez (born 21 June 1938) is a Spanish former cyclist. He competed in the individual road race and team time trial events at the 1960 Summer Olympics.

References

External links
 

1938 births
Living people
Spanish male cyclists
Olympic cyclists of Spain
Cyclists at the 1960 Summer Olympics
Sportspeople from the Province of Jaén (Spain)
Cyclists from Andalusia